David Morier Evans (1819–1874), was a Welsh financial journalist.

Evans, the son of Joshua Lloyd Evans of Llanidloes, Montgomeryshire, was born in 1819. He formed an early connection with journalism, and became assistant city correspondent on the ‘Times,’ a post which he occupied several years, and left to assume the direction of the money articles in the ‘Morning Herald’ and ‘Standard.’

He left the ‘Standard’ at the end of 1872, and in the following March started a paper called the ‘Hour,’ on which he spent his entire means, being adjudicated a bankrupt 19 December 1873. His health broke down under the strain of his financial difficulties, and he died on the morning of 1 January 1874, aged 54. He was married, and left children. He was buried in Abney Park Cemetery, Stamford Hill, the funeral being attended by a large number of brother journalists among whom he was popular.

In addition to his regular work Evans was connected with several other commercial and financial periodicals, among them being the ‘Bankers' Magazine,’ to which he was one of the principal contributors, the ‘Bullionist,’ and the ‘Stock Exchange Gazette.’ He also conducted the literary and statistical departments of the ‘Bankers' Almanac and Diary.’

He published several books, all bearing on or arising out of city affairs, chief among which were: 1. ‘The Commercial Crisis, 1847–8.’ 2. ‘History of the Commercial Crisis, 1857–8, and the Stock Exchange Panic, 1859.’ 3. ‘Facts, Failures, and Frauds: Revelations, Financial, Mercantile, and Criminal,’ 1859. 4. ‘Speculative Notes and Notes on Speculation Ideal and Real,’ 1864. 5. ‘City Men and City Manners.’ 1852.

References

1819 births
1874 deaths
British business and financial journalists
Welsh journalists
19th-century Welsh people
People from Montgomeryshire
Burials at Abney Park Cemetery
19th-century British journalists
British male journalists
19th-century British male writers
19th-century British writers